Vishal Haryana Party (translation:Greater Haryana Party) was a political party in the Indian state of Haryana, led by Rao Birender Singh. It merged with Congress (I) on 23 September 1978. It was first regional party of Haryana and successfully made its own Chief minister only after six months of formation of Haryana state in 1967

Defunct political parties in Haryana
Political parties established in 1966
Political parties disestablished in 1978
1966 establishments in Haryana
Indian National Congress breakaway groups